Uroplakin-1a (UP1a) is a protein that in humans is encoded by the UPK1A gene.

The protein encoded by this gene is a member of the transmembrane 4 superfamily, also known as the tetraspanin family. Most of these members are cell-surface proteins that are characterized by the presence of four hydrophobic domains. 

The proteins mediate signal transduction events that play a role in the regulation of cell development, activation, growth and motility. This encoded protein is found in the asymmetrical unit membrane (AUM) where it can complex with other transmembrane 4 superfamily proteins. 

UP1a may play a role in normal bladder epithelial physiology, possibly in regulating membrane permeability of superficial umbrella cells or in stabilizing the apical membrane through AUM/cytoskeletal interactions.

References

Further reading

Uroplakins